Pau Faner Coll, (Menorca, 1949) is a Spanish novelist and painter. He won numerous prizes, such as the 1988 Ramon Llull Novel Award, for his literary works which are usually centered on mythical themes.

Works

Short narrative 
1972 Contes menorquins
1976 El camp de les tulipes
1981 Amb la mort al darrera
1984 Lady Valentine
1986 AEIOU
1995 La núvia del vent
1997 Roses de paper
2003 Caps de rata
2005 Per no oblidar-te

Children's narratives 
1983 El violí màgic
1985 Ses ganes de riure
1991 L'illa dels homes (La dama de la mitja ametlla I)
1991 El camí de roques negres (La dama de la mitja ametlla II)
1997 Les noces del cel i de la terra (La dama de la mitja ametlla III)

Novels 
1974 L'arcàngel
1976 Un regne per a mi
1979 Potser només la fosca
1983 La vall d'Adam
1986 El cavaller i la fortuna
1986 Viatge de nit
1986 Flor de sal
1988 Moro de rei
1993 Mal camí i bon senyor
1996 Per una mica d'amor
2004 Aetara

References

External links
 Pau Faner at escriptors.cat

1949 births
Living people
People from Ciutadella de Menorca
Spanish novelists
Spanish male novelists
20th-century Spanish painters
20th-century Spanish male artists
Spanish male painters
21st-century Spanish painters
21st-century Spanish male artists